Hierodoris eremita is a moth of the family Oecophoridae. It is endemic to New Zealand and found in the areas around Aoraki / Mount Cook and Westland Tai Poutini National Park areas. This species inhabits alpine herbfields at altitudes of around 900–1400 m. Larvae are said to have been reared on the leaves of plants in the Celmisia genus. Pupation happens on the host plant. The adults of this species is on the wing between December and June. This species is day flying.

Taxonomy 
This species was described by Alfred Philpott in 1930 using five female specimens collected in December at Hooker Valley and Ball Glacier Hutt. The holotype specimen is held at the Canterbury Museum.

Description

As at 2005 the larvae have not yet been described.

Philpott described this species as follows:
Philpott noted that the female specimens he was using to describe the species were very similar in appearance to moths in the Gelophaula genus.

Distribution 
This species is endemic to New Zealand and is found around the Aoraki / Mount Cook and Westland Tai Poutini National Park areas in the Westland and Mackenzie districts.

Behaviour 
Pupation happens on the host plant. The adults of this species is on the wing between December and June. This species is day flying.

Habitat and host species 

This species inhabits alpine herbfields at altitudes of around 900–1400 m. Larvae are said to have been reared on the leaves of Celmisia coriacea from which they had been collected at the Sealy Range. The larvae feed on the underside of the leaves of their host plant. In 1980 the taxonomy of Celmisia coriacea was revised. This species is only found in Fiordland and Southland. Celmisia coriacea is often confused with Celmisia semicordata, a similar looking species with a wider range, including the area around Aoraki / Mount Cook.

References 

Moths described in 1930
Moths of New Zealand
Oecophoridae
Endemic fauna of New Zealand
Taxa named by Alfred Philpott
Endemic moths of New Zealand